Estella B. Diggs (April 21, 1916 – April 18, 2013) was an American businesswoman, writer and politician from New York.

Life
She was born on April 21, 1916, in St. Louis, Missouri. She attended Pace College, City College of New York and New York University. She was in the real estate and catering businesses and was a career counselor. She was also a writer.

Estella Diggs was a member of the New York State Assembly from 1973 to 1980, sitting in the 180th, 181st, 182nd and 183rd New York State Legislatures. She represented the Morrisania section of the Bronx. She helped write more than 70 bills and was responsible for the first Women's, Infants, and Children's program in the state and the first sobering-up station in the Bronx. On November 7, 2011, Estella Diggs Park was dedicated in the Morrisania neighborhood.

She died in 2013, three days before her 97th birthday, in a hospital in the Bronx.

References

1916 births
2013 deaths
Writers from St. Louis
Politicians from the Bronx
Pace University alumni
City College of New York alumni
New York University alumni
Businesspeople from New York City
Women state legislators in New York (state)
Democratic Party members of the New York State Assembly
Writers from the Bronx
20th-century American businesspeople
20th-century American women
21st-century American women